Saint-Amand-les-Eaux (former ) is a commune in the Nord department, northern France. It lies on the river Scarpe, 12 km northwest of Valenciennes. In French, the town people are named Amandinois (m), Amandinoise (f).

The composer Robert Lannoy (1915–1979) was born in Saint-Amand-les-Eaux.

Saint-Amand Abbey, formerly Elnon Abbey, was located here from its foundation in the 630s by Saint Amand until its dissolution in 1789.

Population

Heraldry

Local culture and heritage

Industries 
Saint Amand has an industrial belt, casino, shopping centre, thermal baths, and several springs.

The Tower 
The tower on the Grand'Place standing 82 metres tall is the symbol of this town. It is one of the remaining structures of the former Saint-Amand Abbey, and it was the west façade of the former abbey church, which has been demolished. It has a carillon with 48 bells and a museum devoted to faience. The abbey was founded in the 7th century by a friar named Amand, reconstructed in the 17th century under abbot Nicolas Dubois in a baroque style. Declared national property at the French Revolution in 1789, the abbey was destroyed in 1794. The tower is ornamented with statues, some of which were defaced in 1789. But we can see the Lothaire's statue founder of the Saint Amand school in 9th century in north face. The Saint Amand, Saint Denis, Saint Benoist and Saint Martin's statues on fifth level south face. On south face, third level, we can see the Saint Juliette and Saint Cyr's statues. On fifth level, the Hucbald 's statue which was a poet and musician, and we can see dragons symbolizing the evil spirit tamed by Saint Amand

The clock with roller and the carillon have been constructed in 1640, but the ancient abbey had many bells, too, of which the friar d'Elnon and Giselberg deplore, in a poem, the loss of 17 bells in a fire in 1066. Jehan Froissart, in this chronicles relate the siege of Saint Amand in 1340 and bells war damaged. In 1784-1785, G.L.Barbieux, one of the founders of Tournai, smelted bells down below the tour. The carillon rung the bell at half past eleven to twelve o'clock, from February 18, 1802 ( 15 pluviose, fifth year )  each day to warn the workers that lunch approaches.

The Echevinage 

Named priory too, because it was touched the prior's rooms, built in 1632 during the Flemish Renaissance, was the primary entrance of the abbey. There was magistrate of the town's meeting rooms. In second level there was justice room and jails in street level. One moat, named "Madame" was facing the front door which had drawbridge and portcullis. The bell, named bancloque was called the people so that they hear the magistrate's speeches  than he was screamed on his balcony at the top of the front door. Till then 1958, in the firth level, the peace justice was done. In this level there was wedding room, burned in 1949, rebuilt after. In second level there are echevinal and reception rooms, and the Watteau room where there are paintings painted by himself in 1781 and 1792.

Saint Martin's church 

On the place of the actual church there was a Saint Martin's Mont des Cornet, at the 7th century and romance church in the 11th century.

The ancient faience factories 

Saint Amand is known for its faience, produced, in the past, by ancient faience factories who was used the bianco sopra bianco technical.
1705 Nicolas Demoutier built a faience factory, managed by himself and by the family Dorez, descendants of Bartélémy a ceramist from Lille, in the next place. The faience factory equipment was sold to Bécart in 1775, who has been installed this firm in Valenciennes.
1718, the Fauquez family built their faience factory. They were natives of Tournai in Belgium. The roads, waterways and forests were favourable for transporting the products, so they set up their firm in Saint Amand. But the Treaty of Utrecht, which set the frontier between Tournai and Saint Amand forbade the transport of faience across the border. The faience was hidden in kegs and hay to cross the frontier. The Fauquez's factory was closed in 1794.

Sister cities
 Andernach, Germany since 1959. 
 Dimona, Israel since 1966. 
  Tivoli, Italy since 2001. 
 Irvine, Scotland

See also
Communes of the Nord department

References

External links
Official website

Communes of Nord (French department)
Spa towns in France